T. giganteum may refer to:
 Titanomyrma giganteum, a species of fossil giant ant discovered in Germany, formerly known as Formicium giganteum, and the largest species of ant ever recorded.
 Tricarpelema giganteum, a monocotyledonous herbaceous plant species native to eastern India and Bhutan.

See also
 Giganteum